Cochisea sonomensis is a species of geometrid moth in the family Geometridae. It is found in North America.

The MONA or Hodges number for Cochisea sonomensis is 6647.

References

Further reading

 

Bistonini
Articles created by Qbugbot
Moths described in 1941